Samuel George Blythe (1868 – 1947) was an American writer and newspaperman. In 1933 during the Great Depression he urged people to Buy American in The Saturday Evening Post.

Publications
Cutting It Out: How to Get on the Water Wagon and Stay There (1912)
The Fun of Getting Thin: How to Be Happy and Reduce the Waist Line (1912)
The Fakers (1914)
The Old Game: A Retrospect After Three and a Half Years on the Water-Wagon (1914)
Keeping Fit at Fifty (1921)
Get Rid of that Fat (1928)

References

External links
 
 
 
 Portrait of Samuel G. Blythe, Los Angeles, 1926. Los Angeles Times Photographic Archive (Collection 1429). UCLA Library Special Collections, Charles E. Young Research Library, University of California, Los Angeles.
 Portrait of Samuel G. Blythe, Los Angeles, 1926. Los Angeles Times Photographic Archive (Collection 1429). UCLA Library Special Collections, Charles E. Young Research Library, University of California, Los Angeles.

 
 
 

1868 births
1947 deaths
American male journalists